Zakladnoye is a rural locality (a selo) and the administrative center of Zakladinsky Selsoviet, Romanovsky District, Altai Krai, Russia. The population was 803 as of 2013. There are 12 streets.

Geography 
Zakladnoye is located 20 km southwest of Romanovo (the district's administrative centre) by road. Tambovsky is the nearest rural locality.

References 

Rural localities in Romanovsky District, Altai Krai